JoJo Lake is a lake in Thunder Bay District, Ontario, Canada. The primary inflow and outflow is the Whitesand River.

References

Lakes of Thunder Bay District